Mark Leyner (born 4 January 1956) is an American postmodernist author.

Biography 
Mark Leyner was born in Jersey City, NJ to a Jewish family. He is the son of Joel and Muriel (née Chasan) Leyner, who had divorced by 1997. Leyner received a B.A. from Brandeis University in 1977 and a M.F.A. from University of Colorado in 1979. He was briefly married to Arleen Portada, before marrying his second wife, Mercedes and having a daughter, Gabrielle. He is the older brother of actress and director Chase Leyner.

Leyner employs an intense and unconventional style in his works of fiction. His stories are generally humorous and absurd, with bizarre juxtapositions of people, places and things reminiscent of a Mad Lib. Leyner incorporates many medical references throughout his work.

In The Tetherballs of Bougainville, Mark's father survives a lethal injection at the hands of the New Jersey penal system, and so is freed but must live the remainder of his life in fear of being executed, at New Jersey's discretion, in any situation and regardless of collateral damage. They frequently incorporate elements of meta-fiction: In the same novel, an adolescent Mark produces a film adaptation of the story of his father's failed execution, although he reads a newspaper review of the movie to the prison's warden, and then dies, before even leaving the prison.  At the sentence level, Leyner uses sprawling imagery and an extravagant vocabulary, bordering on prose poetry.

Leyner has also worked as a columnist for Esquire and George magazines, and as a writer for the MTV program Liquid Television. He also co-wrote and voiced a short-lived series of audio fiction called Wiretap.

Leyner also studied with noted post-modern author Steve Katz at the University of Colorado-Boulder.

During the 1990s, Leyner was a resident of Hoboken, New Jersey, together with his dog Carmella.

In the mid-to-late 2000s, Leyner collaborated with Dr. Billy Goldberg on three humorous, though fact-based, books on medicine.

Filmography 
He is credited with co-authoring the screenplay of War, Inc.

Selected works
Novels
Et Tu, Babe (1992)
The Tetherballs of Bougainville (1998)
The Sugar Frosted Nutsack (2012)
Gone with the Mind (2016)
Last Orgy of the Divine Hermit (2021)
Short story collections:
I Smell Esther Williams and Other Stories (1983)
My Cousin, My Gastroenterologist (1990)
Tooth Imprints on a Corn Dog (1996)
Non-fiction
Why Do Men Have Nipples? Hundreds of Questions You'd Only Ask a Doctor After Your Third Martini (2005)
Why Do Men Fall Asleep After Sex? More Questions You'd Only Ask a Doctor After Your Third Whiskey Sour (2006)
Let's Play Doctor: The Instant Guide to Walking, Talking, and Probing like a Real M.D. (2008)

Further reading

Notes and references

External links 
Author profile at Internet Book List, iblist.com
The unofficial Mark Leyner page, spesh.com
Interview with Salon magazine from 1997, salon.com
 
AOL Books Interview with Mark Leyner and Billy Goldberg on their book Why Do Men Fall Asleep After Sex? More Questions You'd Only Ask a Doctor After Your Third Whiskey Sour from 2006.
Interview on War, Inc. at IFC.com

1956 births
Living people
20th-century American novelists
21st-century American novelists
American information and reference writers
American male novelists
American short story writers
Brandeis University alumni
University of Colorado alumni
Writers from Hoboken, New Jersey
Postmodern writers
Jewish American novelists
American male short story writers
Novelists from New Jersey
21st-century American non-fiction writers
American male non-fiction writers
20th-century American male writers
21st-century American male writers